The year 2008 is the 12th year in the history of M-1 Global, a mixed martial arts promotion based in Russia. In 2008 M-1 Global held 12 events beginning with, M-1: Slamm.

Events list

M-1: Slamm

M-1: Slamm was an event held on March 2, 2008, in Almere, Flevoland, Netherlands.

Results

M-1 Challenge 2: Russia

M-1 Challenge 2: Russia was an event held on April 3, 2008, at The Ice Palace Saint Petersburg in Saint Petersburg, Russia.

Results

M-1 MFC: Fedor Emelianenko Cup

M-1 MFC: Fedor Emelianenko Cup was an event held on May 15, 2008, in Russia.

Results

M-1 Challenge 3: Gran Canaria

M-1 Challenge 3: Gran Canaria was an event held on May 31, 2008, in San Agustin, Gran Canaria, Spain.

Results

M-1 Challenge 4: Battle on the Neva 2

M-1 Challenge 4: Battle on the Neva 2 was an event held on June 27, 2008, at The Flying Dutchman in Saint Petersburg, Russia.

Results

M-1 Challenge 5: Japan

M-1 Challenge 5: Japan was an event held on July 17, 2008, at Shinjuku Face in Tokyo, Japan.

Results

M-1 Challenge 6: Korea

M-1 Challenge 6: Korea was an event held on August 29, 2008, in South Korea.

Results

M-1 Challenge 7: UK

M-1 Challenge 7: UK was an event held on September 27, 2008, at The Harvey Hadden Stadium in Nottingham, England.

Results

M-1 Challenge 8: USA

M-1 Challenge 8: USA was an event held on October 29, 2008, at The Harrah's Casino in Kansas City, Missouri, United States.

Results

M-1: Staredown 2

M-1: Staredown 2 was an event held on November 16, 2008, in Germany.

Results

M-1 Challenge 9: Russia

M-1 Challenge 9: Russia was an event held on November 21, 2008, at The Ice Palace Saint Petersburg in Saint Petersburg, Russia.

Results

M-1 Challenge 10: Finland
M-1 Challenge 10: Finland was an event held on November 26, 2008, at The Töölö Sports Hall in Helsinki, Finland.

Results

See also 
 M-1 Global

References

M-1 Global events
2008 in mixed martial arts